National Hohai Technology University (國立河海工科大學) was a university in Nanking, which existed between 1924 and 1927.

In the autumn of 1924, the Engineering College of National Southeastern University and Hohai Engineering Specialized School were merged to form National Hohai Technology University (or Hohai Technological University, Hohai University of Technology, Hohai University of Engineering, Hohai College of Engineering, etc.). Hohai Engineering Specialized School was established in 1915, with specialty of water conservancy. The Engineering College of National Southeastern University was established in 1921, with three departments: civil engineering, mechanical engineering and electrical engineering, and its predecessor is the Polytechnic Faculty of National Nanking Higher Normal School. The first president of National Hohai Technology University is Mao Yisheng. In 1925, Yang Hsiaoshu, the director of teaching affair, took over as president.

In June 1927, National Hohai Technology University was merged with National Southeastern University, along with several other public schools in Jiangsu province, to form the new Nanking capital national university under Nationalist Government, initially called National Dyisyi Chungshan University (Disi Zhongshan University), and soon later renamed Jiangsu University in February 1928 and renamed National Central University in May 1928, and the engineering college of the university was reestablished. In 1949, National Central University was renamed National Nanking University.

In 1952 during the nationwide colleges and departments adjustment, the Engineering College of Nanking University formed several independent schools including Nanjing Institute of Technology which renamed Southeast University in 1988 and Each China Institute of Water Conservancy which renamed Hohai University in 1985.

See also 
 Nanking University
 Southeast University
 Hohai University

Universities and colleges in Nanjing
1924 establishments in China
1927 disestablishments in China